20th Century Women is a 2016 American comedy-drama film directed and written by Mike Mills, based in part on Mills' childhood. Starring Annette Bening, Elle Fanning, Greta Gerwig, Billy Crudup, and Lucas Jade Zumann, the film focuses on the story of three women who explore love and freedom in Southern California during the late 1970s. The film had its world premiere at the New York Film Festival as the Centerpiece on October 8, 2016, and was theatrically released on December 28, 2016 by A24. The film was released to universal acclaim, with Rotten Tomatoes listing an approval rating of 89%, based on 159 reviews, with an average rating of 7.8/10, and Metacritic scoring it at 83 out of 100, based on 40 reviews.

20th Century Women received a Best Original Screenplay nomination at the Academy Awards. The film received three nominations at the Critics' Choice Awards, including Best Actress for Bening, Best Supporting Actress for Gerwig, and Best Acting Ensemble. The film received two nominations at the Golden Globe Awards, including Best Motion Picture – Musical or Comedy and Best Actress – Motion Picture Musical or Comedy for Bening. The film also received a Best Actress nomination for Bening at the Satellite Awards.

Accolades

Notes

References

External links 
 

Lists of accolades by film